Lee Ki-jeong (born 18 July 1995) is a South Korean curler. He competed in the 2018 Winter Olympics as part of the mixed doubles team with partner Jang Hye-ji. In 2021, he won the 2021 Korean Mixed Doubles Curling Championship with partner Kim Min-ji.

Personal life
Lee's brother Ki-bok is also a curler.

References

External links

1995 births
Living people
Curlers at the 2018 Winter Olympics
South Korean male curlers
Olympic curlers of South Korea
21st-century South Korean people
Competitors at the 2017 Winter Universiade